Uropeltis myhendrae, commonly known as Boulenger's earth snake, the Mahendragiri earth snake, and the Myhendra Mountain uropeltis, is a species of snake in the family Uropeltidae. The species is endemic to India.

Geographic range

Type locality: "South Travancore, on the Myhendra Mountain", southern India.

Habitat
The preferred natural habitat of U. myhendrae is forest.

Description
The dorsum of U. myhendrae is dark purplish brown, each scale with a yellowish crescent-shaped posterior border. There are three or four dark transverse blotches behind the head. The venter is yellowish, with small purplish brown spots in adults, but with large transverse blackish rhomboids in young.

Adults may attain  in total length (including tail).

The dorsal scales are in 17 rows at midbody, in 19 rows behind the head. The ventrals number 139-153, and the subcaudals number 7-8.

The snout is obtuse. The rostral is ¼ to almost ⅓ the length of the shielded part of the head. The portion of the rostral visible from above is slightly longer than its distance from the frontal. The nasals are narrowly in contact with each other behind the rostral. The frontal is slightly longer than broad. The diameter of the eye is somewhat more than ½ the length of the ocular shield. The diameter of the body goes 25 to 32 times into the total length. The ventrals are two times as wide as the contiguous scales. The tail is obliquely truncate, flat dorsally, with strongly bicarinate or strongly tricarinate dorsal scales. The terminal scute has a transverse ridge, indistinctly bicuspid, rounded in the young.

Behavior
U. myhendrae is terrestrial and fossorial.

Reproduction
U. myhendrae is ovoviviparous.

References

Further reading

Beddome, R.H. (1886). "An Account of the Earth-Snakes of the Peninsula of India and Ceylon". Annals and Magazine of Natural History, Fifth Series 17: 3–33. (Silybura nilgherriensis Var. myhendrae, new variety, pp. 15–16).
Boulenger, G.A. (1890). The Fauna of British India, Including Ceylon and Burma. Reptilia and Batrachia. London: Secretary of State for India in Council. (Taylor and Francis, printers). xviii + 541 pp. (Silybura myhendræ, new taxonomic status, p. 267).
Sharma, R.C. (2003). Handbook: Indian Snakes. Kolkata: Zoological Survey of India. 292 pp. .
Smith, M.A. (1943). The Fauna of British India, Ceylon and Burma, Including the Whole of The Indo-Chinese Sub-region. Reptilia and Amphibia. Vol. III.—Serpentes. London: Secretary of State for India. (Taylor and Francis, printers). xii + 583 pp. (Uropeltis myhendrae, new combination, p. 83).

External links
 

Uropeltidae
Reptiles of India
Endemic fauna of the Western Ghats
Reptiles described in 1886
Taxa named by Richard Henry Beddome